Long Island is an island in Seychelles, lying in the northeast shores of Mahe.

Geography
Long Island is located in the midst of the Sainte Anne Marine National Park close to Round and Moyenne Islands. This coconut palm-covered gem reaches an elevation of 90m, and features fabulous powder soft beaches and beautiful turquoise seas.

History
In 1825, a settlement was established on the island. A family of Seychelles purchased the islands of Long, Round and Moyenne. 
Their village had about 25 people and was located at the west point. 
In 1900 the village was abandoned and a quarantine station for small-pox sailors was built. 
The island served as the Seychelles juvenile prison.
in 2006 the inmates were transferred to Montagne Posée Prison on the island of Mahe, to do construction work on the new land reclamation projects. The island now hosts the new Pelangi Resort and Spa which consists of 55 villas, 32 one-bedroom villas, 15 two-bedroom villas, 5 four-suite villas and a presidential villa. The hotel features Seychelles’ first funicular – a cable car system – to take guests to its CHI spa facilities and wedding chapel, positioned on the island’s central hilltop.
The staff live on the village on the west end, where the former prison was located. 
along the south coast, a new residential village is being built, with 40 houses, and a new Chapel.

Administration
The island belongs to Mont Fleuri District. 
Being an island with a small population, there are not any government buildings or services. For many services, people have to go to Victoria.

Tourism
Today, the island's main industry is tourism, and it is known for its beaches. 
The island is also visited for its wide variety of underwater creatures like fish, sharks and rays.

Transport
The main means of transportation is bicycles.

Cuisine
Fish is the main ingredient.

Flora & Fauna
The reefs and lagoons of the island offer a large amount of flora and fauna. Green sea turtles live on the very edges of the coral reefs, and they sometimes venture closer to the island. There are butterfly fish, eagle rays, Murray eels and many other species of fish.

Image gallery

References

External links 

 Official Long Island Guide
 National Bureau of Statistics
 info
 Mahe Map 2015
 Info on the island

Islands of Mont Fleuri